Airedale Boat Club is a waterway society on the Leeds and Liverpool Canal in West Yorkshire, England. It was founded in 1959 and its base is situated very close to the Bingley Five Rise Locks flight.

The Aims of the club are "to provide the best facilities for our Members that our income allows, whilst keeping the cost to Members at an affordable level."

The club is a member of the Association of Waterways Cruising Clubs.

See also
List of waterway societies in the United Kingdom

External links
British Waterways West Riding User Group meeting: Airedale Boat Club represented
Bradford Council canal map featuring Airedale Boat Club site
The Telegraph and Argus, 20/8/98, article: "Prayers in pub for canal boat survivors"/ comment from Airedale Boat Club
Jim Shead's site: Airedale Boat Club's website wins second place in competition
Airedale Boat Club website

Clubs and societies in West Yorkshire
Waterways organisations in England
1959 establishments in England